Rao Shuhan (born ) is a Chinese male volleyball player. He is part of the China men's national volleyball team. On club level, he used to play for JTEKT Stings in Japanese highest league, V.League Division 1.

Awards 
 2019–20 V. League – Best 6

References

External links
 profile at FIVB.org

1996 births
Living people
Chinese men's volleyball players
Place of birth missing (living people)
21st-century Chinese people